The Hedmark Group is a geologic group that outcrops in Innlandet, Norway. It preserves microfossils of Neoproterozoic age.

See also

 List of fossiliferous stratigraphic units in Norway

References

 

Geologic groups of Europe
Geologic formations of Norway